For the 2008–09 C.D. Motagua season, F.C. Motagua played in three competitions, the Apertura tournament, the Clausura, and they were also invited to the 2008 Copa Sudamericana.

Apertura

The 2008–09 Apertura Motagua season was the fifty-third season of the Motagua professional football lifetime.  Motagua were looking for the 12th championship. They also attended the 2008 Copa Sudamericana because of Deportivo Saprissa's withdrawal due to the match-day fixtures collide with CONCACAF Champions League's.  For this season Motagua were full with families. Miguel Castillo and Fernando Castillo are brothers, Eleazar Padilla and Esdras Padilla are brothers, Rubén Antonio Rivera and José Carlos Rivera are brothers, Víctor Bernárdez, Jefferson Bernárdez and Oscar Bernárdez are cousins, Shannon Welcome and Georgie Welcome are cousins. Jaime de la Pava replaced Ramón Maradiaga after he left to coach Guatemala national football team. Edmilson da Silva Melo was cut off the team since he received an injury that would leave him out for the rest of the tournament. On 11 September Luis Rodas and Roy Posas were cut off the team due to indecent behavior under the influence of alcohol.

Squad
 The players in bold have senior international caps.

Transfer in

Transfer out

Standings

Matches

Results by round

Pre-season

Regular season

Semifinals

 Marathón 1–1 Motagua on aggregate; Motagua eliminated due to lower position in the Regular season.

Clausura

The 2008-09 Clausura F.C. Motagua season was the fifty-fourth season of the Motagua professional football lifetime.  Motagua were looking for the 12th league championship.  After finishing in semifinals they were looking to become champions next year by signing big names such as Amado Guevara, Ramón Núñez, Marvin Sánchez, Banny Lozano, Javier Portillo, Leonardo Isaula, bringing back Osman Chavez and signing the internationals Mario Jardel, Guillermo Santo and Alberto Blanco. Also they will be losing important starting players, Victor Bernardez, Miguel Castillo and Fernando Castillo. The club's idol, Amado Guevara, joined on a loan because of MLS break. In order to sign more foreign players, Motagua wanted to naturalize Óscar Torlacoff and/or not enroll Nilberto da Silva because of his injury that leaves him off for half of the season.

Squad
 The players in bold have senior international caps.

Transfer in

Transfer out

Standings

Matches

Pre-season

Regular season

2008 Copa Sudamericana

In June 2008 CONMEBOL announced the participation of F.C. Motagua in the 2008 Copa Sudamericana as invitee. At that time Motagua was the Central American team with the best performance achieved at the 2008 CONCACAF Champions' Cup and were not taking part in the next season.

Matches

First round

 Motagua 1–6 Arsenal on aggregate.

References

External links
Motagua Official Website

F.C. Motagua seasons
Motagua
Motagua